José Ingenieros is a town in Tres de Febrero Partido of Buenos Aires Province, Argentina. It is located in the  Greater Buenos Aires urban agglomeration.

Name
The settlement is named in honour of José Ingenieros (24 April 1877 – 31 October 1925), an Argentine physician, positivist philosopher and essayist.

Sport
Estadio Tres de Febrero is located in the town, it is the home stadium of Club Almagro.

External links

Populated places in Buenos Aires Province
Tres de Febrero Partido